Anatrichosoma is a genus of nematodes belonging to the family Trichuridae.

Species:

Anatrichosoma buccalis 
Anatrichosoma cutaneum 
Anatrichosoma cynomolgi 
Anatrichosoma gerbillis 
Anatrichosoma haycocki

References

Nematodes